Compal may refer to:  

 Compal Electronics, a Taiwanese manufacturer
 Sumol + Compal, a Portuguese  food  and beverages  company